Sight is an upcoming American biographical drama film written and starring Terry Chen and Greg Kinnear.  The film is based on Ming Wang's autobiography From Darkness to Sight.  Wang, a Chinese-American medical entrepreneur, will be portrayed by Chen.  Wang will also serve as an executive producer.

Cast
Terry Chen as Ming Wang
Greg Kinnear as Misha Bartnovsky
Ben Wang

Production
Filming began in Vancouver in April 2021 and wrapped after a six week shoot in October 2021.

References

External links
 

Upcoming films
Films shot in Vancouver